Thomas or Tom Shannon may refer to:

Politics
Thomas A. Shannon Jr. (born 1958), U.S. Department of State official
Thomas Bowles Shannon (1827–1897), member of the California State Assembly and U.S. Representative from California, 1863–1865
Thomas Shannon (Ohio politician) (1786–1846), U.S. Representative from Ohio, 1826–1827
Tom Shannon (Australian politician) (1884–1954), member of the New South Wales Legislative Assembly

Others
Thomas Shannon (rugby league), rugby league footballer
Thomas K. Shannon, U.S. naval officer
Tommy Shannon (born 1946), American bass guitarist
Tom Shannon (artist) (born 1947), American artist and inventor
Tom Shannon (broadcaster) (c.1939–2021), American broadcaster and songwriter